Gary Mills may refer to:

Gary Mills (footballer, born 1961), English former football and manager
Gary Mills (footballer, born 1981), English footballer

See also 
Garry Mills (born 1941), British pop singer